Jonathan H. Alter (born October 6, 1957) is a liberal American journalist, best-selling author, Emmy-winning documentary filmmaker and television producer who was a columnist and senior editor for Newsweek magazine from 1983 until 2011. Alter has written several books about American presidents, most recently His Very Best: Jimmy Carter, a Life, published in 2020, the first independent biography of Carter. Alter is a contributing correspondent to NBC News, where since 1996 he has appeared on NBC, MSNBC, and CNBC. In 2021, Alter launched a newsletter called "Old Goats: Ruminating With Friends", where he has conversations with accomplished people who share their wisdom and experience.  In 2013 and 2014, Alter served as an executive producer on the Amazon Studios production Alpha House, which starred John Goodman, Mark Consuelos, Clark Johnson, and Matt Malloy. In 2019, he co-produced and co-directed Breslin and Hamill: Deadline Artists," a documentary about the columnists Jimmy Breslin and Pete Hamill, which received the 2020 Emmy Award for Outstanding Historical Documentary.

Alter's other books are The Center Holds: Obama and His Enemies (2013), The Promise: President Obama, Year One (2010), which went to number three on the New York Times Bestsellers List, Between The Lines: A View Inside American Politics, People and Culture (2008), and The Defining Moment: FDR's Hundred Days and the Triumph of Hope (2006), a New York Times Notable Book of the Year.

A veteran of Chicago politics, Alter has known former President Barack Obama and his closest confidantes for as long as nearly any national columnist, having published the first national magazine cover story on Obama in Newsweeks 2004 "Who's Next Issue."

Alter currently hosts a radio show with his children, "Alter Family Politics," as part of Andy Cohen's 24-hour network, Radio Andy, Channel 102 on Sirius XM.

Early life and education
Alter was raised in a Jewish family in Chicago, the son of James Alter (1922–2014), who owned a refrigeration and air-conditioning company, and Joanne (née Hammerman) (1927–2008), who was an elected commissioner of the Metropolitan Sanitary District of Greater Chicago and a member of the Democratic National Committee. His mother was the first woman in the Chicago area to be elected to public office. He graduated from Phillips Academy in 1975 and Harvard University in 1979, where he was one of the lead editors on the Harvard Crimson.

Career
For a decade in the 1980s, Alter was Newsweeks media critic, where he was among the first in the mainstream media to break tradition and hold other news organizations accountable for their coverage, a precursor to the role later played by blogs. When Newsweek launched his wide-ranging column in 1991, it was the first time the magazine allowed regular political commentary in the magazine, other than on the back page. After Bill Clinton was elected president in 1992, during which time Alter was a consultant to MTV, he was among a small group of reporters and columnists who had regular access to Clinton, though he was far from a reliable supporter, particularly during the Monica Lewinsky scandal. "Alter bites me in the ass sometimes, but at least he knows what we're trying to do," Clinton was quoted as saying in the book Media Circus by The Washington Posts Howard Kurtz.

Alter gained international notoriety on November 7, 2000, the night of the presidential election, when on NBC with Tim Russert and Tom Brokaw, he claimed that the election would be settled in court. He was the first pundit to predict the months-long recount process.

Two months after the September 11 attacks, Alter wrote an article for Newsweek called "Time to think about torture" which became one of his best-known articles. In the column, he suggested that the U.S. might need to "rethink ... old assumptions about law enforcement". Stating that "some torture clearly works", he suggested the nation should "keep an open mind about certain measures to fight terrorism, like court-sanctioned psychological interrogation", and consider transferring some prisoners to other countries with less stringent rules on torture. While Alter did not explicitly advocate physical torture, he later wrote in his book Between the Lines that he regretted writing the article.

Alter was a fierce critic of President George W. Bush, emphasizing what he considered Bush's lack of accountability and his position on embryonic stem cell research. Alter, a cancer survivor, has written about his own bout with lymphoma and experience with an autologous adult stem cell transplant. Despite calling Bush's tone "destructive to American interests," Alter supported Bush's invasion of Iraq, writing in February 2003, "Osama Bin Laden hit us on 9/11 because he thought we were soft and would not respond. Weakness now would further embolden Saddam Hussein."

On NBC's Today Show, Alter was the correspondent for several stories about the effect of the Iraq War on returning veterans. The Defining Moment, which was reviewed respectfully, surprised some critics with its analysis which concluded that the United States had come very close to dictatorship before Franklin D. Roosevelt became president, painting him as the savior of American democracy and capitalism. During an interview with 60 Minutes on November 14, 2008, then-President-elect Barack Obama said he had recently been reading The Defining Moment and hoped to apply some of Roosevelt's strategies that were outlined in the book into his own administration.

A longtime proponent of education reform, Alter played a major role in the Academy Award-nominated documentary Waiting for "Superman". He also sits on the Board of Directors of The 74, an education news website.

In 2009, Alter was the commencement speaker at Western Connecticut State University, which awarded him an honorary doctorate. He also has received honorary degrees from Utica College (2008), Montclair State University (2009), and William Paterson University (2019).

In April 2011, Alter left Newsweek, joining Bloomberg days after.

Alter was an executive producer of the Amazon Studios show Alpha House, starring John Goodman. Written by Doonesbury creator Garry Trudeau, the comedy series revolves around four Republican U.S. Senators who live together in a townhouse on Capitol Hill. After developing the script with Trudeau, Alter sold the pilot to Amazon, which picked up the show as its first original series. The show ran for two seasons, with a total of 21 episodes.

The 2019 HBO film Breslin and Hamill: Deadline Artists was co-produced and co-directed by Alter, with Steve McCarthy and John Block. The documentary was the winner of the 2020 Emmy Award for Outstanding Historical Documentary, and is available on HBO Max.

Personal life
Alter lives in Montclair, New Jersey, with his wife, Emily Lazar, a former executive producer of the Comedy Central show The Colbert Report, and The Late Show with Stephen Colbert and a longtime television news talent producer. Their three children are: Charlotte Alter (b. 1990), a senior national correspondent for Time Magazine, Tommy (b. 1991), a producer for HBO Sports and co-founder of ThreeFourTwo Productions, and Molly (b. 1993), who works as a principal for Index Ventures and was selected in 2020 as one of Forbes' "30 Under 30" in venture capital.

Alter's family has had wide-ranging influence in politics. His mother, Joanne, was the first woman elected to public office in Cook County, Illinois. His sister Jamie Alter Lynton, a journalist and brother-in-law Michael Lynton, the former CEO of Sony Corporation of America, were two of the most politically active Obama fundraisers in California. His cousin, Charles Rivkin, is a creator of the Muppets franchise, a former United States Ambassador to France; and the chair of the Motion Picture Association of America (MPAA); another cousin, Robert S. Rivkin, is a former deputy mayor of Chicago. Rivkin's wife Cindy S. Moelis is the former head of the White House Fellows Program and one of former First Lady of the United States Michelle Obama's closest friends. Alter is a former member of the Board of Directors of DonorsChoose, which allows teachers to post online proposals for classroom materials, and a current board member of The Blue Card, a national Jewish organization assisting Holocaust survivors, the Century Foundation, and the Bone Marrow Foundation.

References

External links

Jonathan Alter's website
Jon Alter's newsletter OLD GOATS: Ruminating with Friends
Video debates/discussions featuring Alter on Bloggingheads.tv

1957 births
20th-century American non-fiction writers
21st-century American non-fiction writers
21st-century American historians
21st-century American male writers
American bloggers
American columnists
American male bloggers
American male non-fiction writers
American media critics
American political writers
American television journalists
The Harvard Crimson people
Historians of the United States
Jewish American journalists
Jewish American historians
Living people
MSNBC people
NBC News people
Newsweek people
People from Montclair, New Jersey
Phillips Academy alumni
Writers from Chicago
20th-century American male writers
Historians from Illinois
Historians from New Jersey

 Francis W. Parker School (Chicago) alumni